WASP-121b is an extrasolar planet orbiting the star WASP-121. WASP-121b is the first exoplanet found to contain water in an extrasolar planetary stratosphere (i.e., an atmospheric layer in which temperatures increase as the altitude increases). WASP-121b is in the constellation Puppis, and is about 850 light-years from Earth.

In August 2022, this planet and its host star were included among 20 systems to be named by the third NameExoWorlds project.

Characteristics

WASP-121b is a "hot Jupiter" exoplanet with a mass about 1.18 times that of Jupiter and a radius about 1.81 times that of Jupiter. The exoplanet orbits WASP-121, its host star, every 1.27 days.

In 2019 a work by Hellard et al. discussed the possibility of measuring the Love number of transiting hot Jupiters using HST/STIS.

The planetary orbit is inclined to the equatorial plane of the star by 8.1°.

Atmospheric composition
A spectral survey in 2015 attributed , hot stratosphere absorption bands to water molecules, titanium(II) oxide (TiO) and vanadium(II) oxide (VO). Neutral iron was also detected in the stratosphere of WASP-121b in 2020, along with neutral chromium and vanadium.
The detection claims of titanium(II) oxide (TiO) and vanadium(II) oxide (VO) have since been disproved.

Reanalysis of aggregated spectral data was published in June 2020. Neutral magnesium, calcium, vanadium, chromium, iron, and nickel, along with ionized sodium atoms, were detected. The low quality of available data preclude a positive identification of any molecular species, including water. The atmosphere appears to be significantly out of chemical equilibrium and possibly escaping. The strong atmospheric flows beyond the Roche lobe, indicating ongoing atmosphere loss, were confirmed in late 2020.

In 2021, the planetary atmosphere turned out to be slightly more blue and less absorbing, which may be an indication of planetary weather patterns. By mid-2021, the presence of ions of iron, chromium, vanadium and calcium in planetary atmosphere was confirmed. In 2022, barium was also detected. By 2022, an absence of titanium in the planetary atmosphere was confirmed and attributed to the nightside condensation of the highly refractory Titanium dioxide.

See also

 List of exoplanet firsts
 List of exoplanets discovered in 2015
 SuperWASP
 WASP-33b

References

External links
 SuperWASP Wide Angle Search for Planets: The Planets, SuperWASP.
 

Exoplanets discovered by WASP
Exoplanets discovered in 2015
Puppis
Hot Jupiters